Jiří Koudela is a Czechoslovak retired slalom canoeist who competed in the late 1960s and early 1970s. He won three medals at the ICF Canoe Slalom World Championships with two golds (Mixed C-2: 1971; Mixed C-2 team: 1969) and a bronze (Mixed C-2: 1969).

References

Czechoslovak male canoeists
Czech male canoeists
Living people
Year of birth missing (living people)
Medalists at the ICF Canoe Slalom World Championships